Huanuni is a town in the department of Oruro, Bolivia.

Population
The population of the town of Huanuni has increased following a decline in the 1970s and 1980s. Population has increased in the last two decades by about 25 percent:
1976: 17 292 inhabitants (census) 
1992: 14 083 inhabitants (Census) 
2001: 15 106 inhabitants (Census) 
2010: 17 378 inhabitants

References

Populated places in Oruro Department